Mionochroma aterrimum is a species of beetle in the family Cerambycidae. It was described by Gounelle in 1911. It is known from southeastern Brazil.

References

Cerambycinae
Beetles described in 1911